Cinco is a small crater in the Descartes Highlands of the Moon visited by the astronauts of Apollo 16.  The crater is one of a group of five (hence the name, Spanish for five) craters that were collectively called the Cinco craters during the Apollo 16 mission.  The craters were designated a, b, c, d, and e, and the largest (a) was officially named Cinco after the mission in 1973 by the IAU.

On April 21, 1972, the Apollo 16 Apollo Lunar Module Orion landed about 4 km north of Cinco, northeast of the prominent South Ray crater.  The astronauts John Young and Charles Duke explored the area over the course of three EVAs using a Lunar Roving Vehicle, or rover. They drove up Stone Mountain to Station 4, about 80 m west of Cinco crater, on EVA 2. The primary goal of sampling on Stone Mountain was to attempt to sample the Descartes Formation, although it remains unclear if the Descartes was sampled.

External links
 Apollo 16 Traverses, NASA Lunar Photomap 78D2S2(25)

References

Apollo 16
Impact craters on the Moon